Philip Kennedy may refer to:

 Philip Kennedy (hurler) (born 1960), Irish hurler
 Philip Kennedy (footballer), Scottish footballer